Trollhunters: Defenders of Arcadia is a video game based on the television series Trollhunters: Tales of Arcadia. It was released for Microsoft Windows, Nintendo Switch, PlayStation 4, and Xbox One on September 25, 2020, and for Google Stadia on January 25, 2022. It was developed by WayForward and published by Outright Games, with physical European distribution handled through Bandai Namco Entertainment.

Gameplay
Trollhunters: Defenders of Arcadia is a side-scrolling action-platformer in which players control Jim Lake Jr. or Claire Nuñez to prevent the Time-pocalypse. Players also collect artifacts, level up armor and fight fantasy creatures (trolls, dragons and goblins).

Cast 
 Emile Hirsch as Jim Lake Jr.
 David Bradley as Merlin
 Lexi Medrano as Claire
 Charlie Saxton as Toby Domzalski
 Colin O'Donoghue as Douxie
 Tatiana Maslany as Aja
 Sebastian Lopez Hinton as Krel, Misc Voices
 Ike Amadi as Angor Rot
 Yvonne Angulo as Morgana
 Brook Chalmers as Porgon, Misc Voices
 Fred Tatasciore as AAARRRGGHH!!!, Gunmar, Blinky, Bagdwella, Vendel
 Tom Kenny as Gut, NotEnrique, Gnomes

References

2020 video games
Action video games
Works by Guillermo del Toro
Tales of Arcadia
Video games based on animated television series
Video games developed in the United States
Xbox One games
PlayStation 4 games
Nintendo Switch games
Windows games
WayForward games
Multiplayer and single-player video games
Outright Games games